Narayanan (better known as Aadukalam Naren) is an Indian actor who has appeared in Tamil and few Telugu films, mainly in supporting roles. He made his début in 1997 film Raman Abdullah but he got noticed for his role in the 2011 film, Aadukalam directed by Vetrimaaran. He earlier appeared in Balu Mahendra's television series Kathai Neram.

Partial filmography

Tamil films

Telugu films

Malayalam films

Television

References

External links
 

Indian male film actors
Tamil male actors
Living people
21st-century Indian male actors
Year of birth missing (living people)
Male actors in Tamil cinema
Tamil male television actors
Television personalities from Tamil Nadu
Male actors from Chennai
21st-century Tamil male actors
Male actors in Telugu cinema